The Ministry of Foreign Affairs is a ministry of the Government of Haiti. This ministry is responsible for international relations and is part of the Prime Minister's Cabinet.

See also
 Foreign Ministers of Haiti
 List of diplomatic missions in Haiti
 List of diplomatic missions of Haiti

Government ministries of Haiti
Foreign relations of Haiti
Haiti